Fagivorina arenaria, the speckled beauty, is a moth of the family Geometridae. The species was first described by Johann Siegfried Hufnagel in 1767. It is found from most of central Europe to the Balkan Peninsula and Ukraine. In the south it is found up to Sicily and in the north to Sweden and Norway.

The wingspan is 22–30 mm. Adults are on wing from May to July.

The larvae feed on deciduous trees, including Fagus sylvatica and Quercus species.

External links

Fauna Europaea
www. Lepiforum e. V.
Schmetterlinge-Deutschlands.de

Boarmiini
Moths of Europe
Taxa named by Johann Siegfried Hufnagel